The McKenzie River is a perennial river of the Bemm River catchment, located in the East Gippsland region of the Australian state of Victoria.

Course and features
The river descends  over its  course.

The McKenzie River sub-catchment area is managed by the East Gippsland Catchment Management Authority.

See also

 List of rivers of Australia

References

External links
 
 
 
 

East Gippsland catchment
Rivers of Gippsland (region)